Helen Boughton-Leigh (January 15, 1906 – December 28, 1999) was an American alpine skier. She competed in the women's combined event at the 1936 Winter Olympics.

Although originally American, she adopted British nationality for a short time in the 1930s. She also won a silver medal at the 1933 Slalom World Championship.

References

1906 births
1999 deaths
American expatriates in the United Kingdom
American female alpine skiers
Olympic alpine skiers of the United States
Alpine skiers at the 1936 Winter Olympics
Sportspeople from Cleveland
20th-century American women